The discography for the American jazz rock band Steely Dan consists of nine studio albums, 21 singles, two live albums, one live set on DVD, seven compilations in the United States, one box set, and numerous other appearances. The band has sold more than forty million albums worldwide.

Albums

Studio albums

Live albums and video

Compilations

Bootlegs and other appearances

Singles

Notes

Tribute albums
The Hoops McCann Band – Plays the Music of Steely Dan (1988)
Various artists – No Static at All: An Instrumental Tribute to Steely Dan (2000)
Various artists – The Royal Dan - A Tribute to the Genius of Steely Dan (2006)
Various artists – Maestros of Cool: A Tribute to Steely Dan (2006)

References

Discography
Rock music group discographies